Stavros Michalakakos (in Greek Σταύρος Μιχαλακάκος) (born 9 April 1987) is a Greek Cypriot singer. On 12 February 2010 he won the second season of the Greek version of the television singing competition The X Factor. He was awarded a recording contract and a car. Michalakakos is the second Cypriot to have won the Greek competition, after Loukas Giorkas won the first season.

Michalakakos' debut single, "Vres To Nisi" (Find the Island), a Greek-language cover of the 1979 Nick Lowe single "Cruel to Be Kind" with lyrics by Nikos Moraitis, was digitally released on 11 June 2010.

References

External links
Stavros Michalakakos MySpace site

1987 births
The X Factor winners
Living people